Oncioderes is a genus of longhorn beetles of the subfamily Lamiinae, containing the following species:

 Oncioderes picta Martins & Galileo, 1990
 Oncioderes rondoniae Martins & Galileo, 1990

References

Onciderini